The National Basketball League of Canada's Defensive Player of the Year Award is an annual National Basketball League of Canada (NBL) award given since the 2011–12 season. The London Lightning's Al Stewart was named Defensive Player of the Year in 2012 and 2013, the most seasons a single player has won the award.

Winners

References 

National Basketball League of Canada awards